Cao Yuan (born 7 February 1995) is a Chinese diver and an Olympic gold medalist, having won three golds, one silver and one bronze in the Olympics.  He has also won golds in diving at the World Championships and World Cups.

Early life
Cao Yuan was born on 7 February 1995 in Hunan province. Cao Yuan started diving at age 5. His mother wanted him to learn discipline so enrolled him in diving classes.

His life motto is "Go your own way and see your own scenery. Be calm for life's ups and downs."

Career

He competed at the 2012 Summer Olympics in the Men's synchronized 10-metre platform, winning the gold medal. He won the gold medal at 2010 Asian Games in Men's 10-meter platform at the age of 15.

Cao Yuan is the only diver in history to win 3 gold medals in a single World Diving Series event by winning gold medals in 3m synchro, 10m synchro, and 10m individual events of the 2014 World Diving Series in Canada.

Cao Yuan together with Yue Lin are the only divers to ever win two World Series gold medals on the same day of the competition by winning the 3m synchro and 10m synchro events on 30 May 2014.

In 2015, he partnered with Qin Kai on the men's 3m synchro springboard at the World Championships in Kazan and won gold.

At the 2016 Summer Olympics in Rio, Cao led throughout the competition in the men's 3m springboard event, and won gold with a score of 547.60. He also won bronze in the 3m springboard synchronized dive with Qin Kai.

In 2017, at the World Championships in Budapest, Cao won silver pairing with Xie Siyi in the 3m synchro.  In the 2018 World Cup, he won a gold in the 3m synchro with Xie, as well as a silver in the individual 3m springboard.

At the 2019 World Aquatics Championships held in Gwangju, South Korea, Cao Yuan won gold in both the men's synchronised diving events. In the 3m synchro with Xie, the pair won with their last two dives, and he also won with Chen Aisen in the 10m synchro.

At the 2020 Summer Olympics in Tokyo, Cao and teammate Aisen Chen won silver in men's synchronized 10m platform. He also won gold in individual 10m platform with 582.35 points.

Accolades
In 2014, he was named the Male Diver of the Year by the International Swimming Federation (FINA). He was again given the accolade in 2018.

He received the 4 May Youth Medal of Beijing in the People's Republic of China in 2014.

See also
China at the 2012 Summer Olympics

References

External links
 
 
 
 
 

1995 births
Living people
2016 Olympic gold medalists for China
2016 Olympic bronze medalists for China
Asian Games medalists in diving
Asian Games gold medalists for China
Asian Games silver medalists for China
Chinese male divers
Divers at the 2010 Asian Games
Divers at the 2014 Asian Games
Divers at the 2018 Asian Games
Divers at the 2012 Summer Olympics
Divers at the 2016 Summer Olympics
Divers at the 2020 Summer Olympics
Medalists at the 2010 Asian Games
Medalists at the 2014 Asian Games
Medalists at the 2018 Asian Games
Medalists at the 2012 Summer Olympics
Medalists at the 2016 Summer Olympics
Medalists at the 2020 Summer Olympics
Olympic divers of China
Olympic medalists in diving
Olympic silver medalists for China
Sportspeople from Beijing
World Aquatics Championships medalists in diving
20th-century Chinese people
21st-century Chinese people